Bijker is a surname. Notable people with the surname include:

Eco Bijker (1924-2012), Dutch professor of Coastal Engineering
Lucas Bijker (born 1993), Dutch footballer
Wiebe Bijker (born 1951), Dutch professor of Social Science

See also
Bikker